Joseph Hager (Milan, April 30, 1757 – Milan, June 27, 1819) was an Austrian linguist, lexicographer, orientalist, writer and academic naturalized Italian.

Biography 
He was born in Milan from Giuseppe and Marianna Tyher from a family of Viennese origin, at the age of ten was sent to Vienna to study Oriental languages at the K.k. Akademie für Orientalische Sprachen, founded in 1754 to prepare diplomatic personnel to be sent to the East. He became professor of Arabic language at the University of Vienna.

He then continued his studies at the University of Pavia where, in 1783, he obtained a doctorate in Theology, joining the Friars Minor Reformers and moving to Rome at the Congregation for the Evangelization of Peoples, where he began to interest and study the Chinese language.

In 1788 he was called to settle the dispute over some documents forged by the monk and scholar . From his travels in Sicily, drew the work Gemälde von Palermo.

There followed an intense period of his life where he traveled moving between Leipzig, Hamburg and Berlin. He published in London the first dictionary of Chinese in 1800: Proposal for publishing by subscription ..., a dictionary of Chinese language and then his most important work on the Chinese language: An explanation of the elementary characters of the Chinese.

In 1806 he returned to Italy, to Pavia where he was appointed professor of Chinese and Oriental languages, until 1809 when, with the new regulations of the Kingdom of Italy, the teaching of Oriental languages was suppressed throughout the Italian territory. The following year he was appointed by the Biblioteca di Brera as sub-librarian. In 1815 he returned to teach at the University of Pavia in the Faculty of Oriental Languages.

Works 
Some of his writings include:

Note

Bibliography 

 
 Marica Roda, HAGER, Giuseppe, in Dizionario biografico degli italiani, LXI volume, Roma, Istituto dell'Enciclopedia Italiana, 2004. URL consultato il 25 luglio 2016.

University of Pavia alumni
19th-century Italian writers
18th-century Italian writers
Travel writers
Austrian writers
Academic staff of the University of Vienna
Academic staff of the University of Pavia